Until August 2005, Britain in Europe was the main British pro-European pressure group.  Despite connections to Labour and the Liberal Democrats, it was a cross-party organisation with supporters from many different political backgrounds.  Initially founded to campaign for a “Yes” vote for the euro, it then progressed to support a “Yes” vote for the referendum on the Treaty establishing a Constitution for Europe.

The organisation was launched in 1999 by Tony Blair, Gordon Brown, Kenneth Clarke, Michael Heseltine and Charles Kennedy. In 2003, the organisation formally linked itself with the Brussels-based, pro-European, international organisation European Movement.

The director of Britain in Europe was Simon Buckby and later Lucy Powell. The director of communications was the Scottish Liberal Democrat politician Danny Alexander.

On 17 August 2005, the group was wound up following the French and Dutch "No" votes on the proposed European Constitution. Its resources were turned over to the European Movement.

A successor pro-EU campaign, founded in 2012, is British Influence.

Publications 
All are PDF files 
Straight Bananas: 201 anti-European myths exploded (543kb) 
There's something about UKIP (223kb)
The Truth is Out There (865kb)

Backers 
The organisation disclosed the names of individuals and companies from which it received donations of more than £5,000, in line with the requirements of the Political Parties Act, although it was not a political party and was not obliged to do so.

List of backers 
amicus
Alstom UK Ltd
Rod Aldridge
BAE Systems
BMP DDB
BAT
Kumar Bhattacharyya
Winfried Bischoff
British Midland
British Telecommunications plc
Bunzl plc
Cookson Group plc
Dyson Appliances Ltd
Ernst & Young LLP
European Movement
Lord Evans of Watford
Ford Motor Company
Chris Gent
Christopher Haskins
Lord Hollick
Lord Howe of Aberavon
ICL plc
Kellogg's
Kimberly-Clark Ltd
KPMG
Lord Marshall of Knightsbridge
Mind share UK
Nestlé (UK) Ltd
Gulam Noon
Lindsay Owen-Jones
Philips Electronics (UK) Ltd
PricewaterhouseCoopers
Reuters Group plc
Joseph Rowntree Reform Trust
Lord Sainsbury of Turville
Colin Sharman, Baron Sharman
Siemens AG Plc
Barry Townsley
Adair Turner
UBM plc
Unilever plc
Xerox Ltd
Wrigley UK Ltd

See also 
British Influence
UKIP

External links 

Unofficial information page
"Britain in Europe : Why Britain Should Join The Euro", pamphlet by Richard Layard, Willem Buiter, Christopher Huhne, Will Hutton, Peter Kenen and Adair Turner, 1 August 2002

Brexit–related advocacy groups in the United Kingdom
Pro-Europeanism in the United Kingdom
1999 establishments in the United Kingdom